Sonalde Desai is a sociologist and demographer. She is a Distinguished University Professor of Sociology at the University of Maryland, College Park,. and a professor at the National Council of Applied Economic Research, where she serves as the first direction of the National Data Innovation Centre. She is the principal investigator for the India Human Development Survey, a nationwide panel data survey or more than 40,000 households in more than 2,000 villages and urban neighborhoods. In 2022, she served as president of the Population Association of America. In 2023 she was named a fellow of the American Association for the Advancement of Science.

Desai's research concerns social inequality in developing countries, especially with regard to gender and class. Her research on women's education and employment in India, and its implications for child health and development, has been especially influential. Much of her research concerns gender and development in India. She also writes frequently on topics related to population and inequality for publications such as The Indian Express and The Hindu.

Desai was raised in Gujarat and Mumbai by parents involved in the Indian independence movement. She attended the University of Mumbai (then Bombay) before seeking graduate education at Case Western Reserve University and Stanford University.

References 

Women sociologists
Women social scientists
Indian women academics
Year of birth missing (living people)
Living people